The 1869 Nottingham by-election was fought on 16 June 1869.  The by-election was fought due to the death of the incumbent MP of the Liberal Party, Sir Robert Juckes Clifton.  It was won by the Liberal candidate Charles Seely.

References

1869 elections in the United Kingdom
1869 in England
19th century in Nottingham
Elections in Nottingham
By-elections to the Parliament of the United Kingdom in Nottinghamshire constituencies
June 1869 events